Melathemma polita is a species of beetle in the family Cerambycidae, the only species in the genus Melathemma.  It is indigenous to the Amazon Rainforest.

References

Cerambycini